RiverFront Place Condos is a new condo development located along the riverfront in Downtown Omaha, Nebraska. It consists of two condo towers anchored by two rows of town homes. Tower one, completed in 2006, is 12 stories tall and holds 36 units. Tower two began construction in 2009 and is 15 stories tall. There are 18 contemporary town homes that were completed in 2006. The development features a large green space and is adjacent to the Bob Kerrey Pedestrian Bridge and Gallup University Campus.

References 

Twin towers
Buildings and structures in Omaha, Nebraska